Kaivalya, is the ultimate goal of aṣṭāṅga yoga and means "solitude", "detachment" or "isolation", a vrddhi-derivation from kevala "alone, isolated". It is the isolation of purusha from prakṛti, and liberation from rebirth, i.e., Moksha. Kaivalya-Mukti is described in some Upanishads, such as Muktika and Kaivalya as the most superior form of Moksha which can grant liberation both within this life, as Jivanmukti, and after death, as Videhamukti.

Patanjali 

The 34 Yoga Sutras of Patanjali of the fourth chapter deal with impressions left by our endless cycles of birth and the rationale behind the necessity of erasing such impressions. It portrays the yogi, who has attained kaivalya, as an entity who has gained independence from all bondages and achieved the absolute true consciousness or ritambhara prajna described in the Samadhi Pada.

"…Or, to look from another angle, the power of pure consciousness settles in its own pure nature."
—Kaivalya Pada: Sutra 34.

"Only the minds born of meditation are free from karmic impressions."
—Kaivalya Pada: Sutra 6.

"Since the desire to live is eternal, impressions are also beginningless.
The impressions being held together by cause, effect, basis and support, they disappear with the disappearance of these four."
—Kaivalya Pada: Sutra 10–11.

Upanishads 

The terms kevala, kaivalya, or kaivalya-mukti are encountered in the Upanishads, including the Śvetāśvatara (I and VI) Kaivalya (25), the Amṛtabindu (29) and the Muktikā (1.18, 26, 31) Upanishads .

The Muktika Upanishad (sloka 1.18–29) as explained by Rama to Hanuman, is the most superior form of Moksha and the essence of all Upanishads, higher than the four types of Mukti namely: Salokya, Saameepya, Sarupya, & Sayujya. In section 2 of the same Upanishad, Rama mentioned that Kaivalya-Mukti is the ultimate liberation (both jivanmukti and videha-mukti) from prarabdha karma and it can be attained by everyone through studying the 108  authentic Upanishads thoroughly from a realized guru, which will destroy the three forms of bodies (gross, subtle and causal).

The Yogatattva Upanishad (16–18) reads, "Kaivalya is the very nature of the self, the supreme state (paramam padam). It is without parts and is stainless. It is the direct intuition of the Real-existence, intelligence and bliss. it is devoid of birth, existence, destruction, recognition, and experience. This is called knowledge."

In later Hinduism and its native tribal sects 

Following the rise of Hinduism with the Vijayanagara Empire in the 14th century, Veerashaivism experienced growth in southern India.
Some Veerashaiva scholars of the time such as Nijaguna Shivayogi (c. 1500) attempted to unify Veerashaivism with Shankara's Advaitism.
His best known work is the Kaivalya Paddhati, a collection of swara cavhanas set to classical ragas.

Other popular writers of this tradition are Nijaguna Shivayogi, Shadaksharadeva(Muppina Shadakshari), Mahalingaranga and Chidanandavadhuta.
The Kaivalya literature was entirely in the Kannada language.

Vijñānabhiksu was a sixteenth-century Vedāntic philosopher. He writes about kaivalya explicitly in the fourth and final chapter of his Yogasārasamgraha.

In Assam, the aboriginal ethnic Kaibarta-Jalkeot people (those still not Sanskritised) call their original religion Kewaliya Dharma.
In this sect, "kewolia" is the highest stage at which the Bhakot becomes unconscious of everything else except the natural Animistic all-pervading Entity. 
They are related to the original Ratikhowa Hokam and are originally from the indigenous Kaibarta community. The Ratikhowa Puja and Hokam, Marei Puja, Kewaliya Dharma, Chamon Puja, Jal Goxai/Kuwor/Dangoria aak Thogi Dia and other Ancestral Night Spirit Worship of Tantric origin can be considered the original native remnants of the original Kaibarta tribal Tantric Religious traditions and culture related to religious beliefs of their ancestors Luipa, Minapa etc.

In Jainism

Kaivalya, also known as Kevala Jnana, means omniscience in Jainism and is roughly translated as complete understanding or supreme wisdom.

Kevala jnana is believed to be an intrinsic quality of all souls. This quality is masked by karmic particles that surround the soul. Every soul has the potential to obtain omniscience by shedding off these karmic particles. Jain scriptures speak of twelve stages through which the soul achieves this goal. A soul who has attained kevala jnana is called a kevalin. According to the Jains, only kevalins can comprehend objects in all aspects and manifestations; others are only capable of partial knowledge.

See also 

 Moksha
 Kevala Jnana
 Kaivalya Upanishad

References

Sources 

 Ashtanga Yoga, The Eight-Limbs of Yoga
 Muktika Upanishad

Yoga concepts
Hindu philosophical concepts
Moksha
Mystical union